The 1000 meters distance for men in the 2014–15 ISU Speed Skating World Cup was contested over seven races on six occasions, out of a total of seven World Cup occasions for the season, with the first occasion taking place in Obihiro, Japan, on 14–16 November 2014, and the final occasion taking place in Erfurt, Germany, on 21–22 March 2015.

The defending champion was Shani Davis of the United States. Pavel Kulizhnikov of Russia won the cup in his first World Cup season, while Davis had to settle for eighth place.

Top three

Race medallists

Standings 
Standings as of 21 March 2015 (end of the season).

References 

 
Men 1000